|}

The Paddy Power Gold Cup is a Premier Handicap National Hunt chase in Great Britain which is open to horses aged four years or older. It is run on the Old Course at Cheltenham over a distance of about 2 miles and 4½ furlongs (2 miles 4 furlongs and 44 yards, or 4,064 metres), and during its running there are sixteen fences to be jumped. It is a handicap race, and it is scheduled to take place each year in mid November.

The event was established in 1960, and it was originally sponsored by Mackeson. It was known as the Mackeson Gold Cup until 1995, but since then it has had various sponsors and several title changes. It was backed by Murphy's from 1996, and by Thomas Pink from 2000. The bookmaker Paddy Power began supporting the race in 2003 and their sponsorship continued until the 2015 running. In 2016 the sponsorship was taken over by another bookmaking firm BetVictor. Paddy Power returned for a second period of sponsorship in 2020.

Records
Most successful horse (2 wins):
 Fortria – 1960, 1962
 Gay Trip – 1969, 1971
 Half Free – 1984, 1985
 Bradbury Star – 1993, 1994
 Cyfor Malta – 1998, 2002

Leading jockey (4 wins):
 Tony McCoy – Cyfor Malta (1998), Lady Cricket (2000), Shooting Light (2001), Exotic Dancer (2006)

Leading trainer (8 wins):
 Martin Pipe – Beau Ranger (1987), Challenger du Luc (1996), Cyfor Malta (1998, 2002), Lady Cricket (2000), Shooting Light (2001), Celestial Gold (2004), Our Vic (2005)

Winners
 Weights given in stones and pounds.

See also
 Horse racing in Great Britain
 List of British National Hunt races

References

 Racing Post:
 pedigreequery.com – Paddy Power Gold Cup Chase – Cheltenham.
 sportingchronicle.com – Paddy Power Gold Cup.
 
  – BetVictor Gold Cup Chase – Cheltenham.

External links
 Race Recordings 

National Hunt races in Great Britain
Cheltenham Racecourse
National Hunt chases
Recurring sporting events established in 1960
1960 establishments in England